Good Morning Beautiful is the debut album by Los Angeles indie band Irving.

Track listing
"Crumbling Mountain Tops"
"Eyes Adjust to Light"
"L-O-V-E"
"Sleepy Inside"
"Did I Ever Tell You I'm in Love with Your Girlfriend"
"Holiday"
"March Was Fair at Best"
"Turn of the Century"
"Heading North"
"A Very Frivolous Distribution of Sundries"
"Faster Than Steam"

2002 debut albums
Irving (band) albums